Lieutenant-Commander Richard John Hammersley Ryan, GC (23 July 1903 – 21 September 1940) was a Royal Navy officer who was posthumously awarded the George Cross along with Chief Petty Officer Reginald Vincent Ellingworth for the "great gallantry and undaunted devotion to duty" they displayed while attempting to defuse a mine which had fallen on Dagenham in Essex on 21 September 1940.

Early life and career
Ryan was from a naval family, the son of Admiral Frank Edward Cavendish Ryan. He joined the Royal Navy in the early 1920s, was promoted to lieutenant in 1925, and lieutenant commander on 1 August 1933.

Second World War
The pair had defused many such devices together, and had just successfully defused a device in Hornchurch which was threatening an aerodrome and explosives factory when they were called to Dagenham.  The bomb there was hanging from its parachute on a warehouse.

Notice of the award appeared in the London Gazette of 20 December 1940:

References

1940 deaths
Deaths by airstrike during World War II
Royal Navy personnel killed in World War II
British recipients of the George Cross
Royal Navy recipients of the George Cross
Royal Navy officers of World War II
Bomb disposal personnel
1903 births
People from Rotherham
Military personnel from Yorkshire